Boston, Virginia may refer to:

 Boston, Accomack County, Virginia, a census-designated place
 Boston, Culpeper County, Virginia, an unincorporated community